Anne Victoire Dervieux (1752-1826) was a French ballerina, opera singer, and courtesan.

Life
Dervieux was the daughter of a washer woman in Paris.

Stage career
She was engaged at the Paris Opera in 1765, (aged 13), where she was active as a ballet dancer before she retrained to become an opera singer.  As a singer, she performed at the Concert Spirituel, and her greatest triumph was said to have been her performance in Pygmalion in 1772.

Courtesan
She attracted much fame for her parallel career as a courtesan. She has been referred to as the rival of Madeleine Guimard. Among her clients where the Louis François Joseph, Prince of Conti and the brothers of Louis XVI, the count of Artois and the count de Provence; she also shared her client Charles, Prince of Soubise with Madeleine Guimard. Derievux, as well as Guimard, were celebrities of their time and frequently portrayed in the scandal press.

Residence
She became known for her extravagant residence, a palace she had constructed in rue Chantereine Paris, filled with her valuable fine art collections. The building was originally design by architect Alexandre-Théodore Brongniart and later re-worked by the architect François-Joseph Bélanger

Later life
Dervieux married François-Joseph Bélanger in 1794 and retired from her stage career as well as from her career as a courtesan. She adopted a girl around this time. She was imprisoned during The Terror of Robespierre, but avoided execution. Dervieux died in Paris in 1829.

References

Bibliography

Further reading
 
 

1752 births
1826 deaths
18th-century French ballet dancers
French courtesans
18th-century French women opera singers